Heavitree Gap Police Station is a historic building within the Heavitree Gap Police Station Historical Reserve. It is located on the southwestern side of Heavitree Gap in Alice Springs in the Northern Territory of Australia.

History

The area was declared as a conservation reserve under Section 12 of the Territory Parks and Wildlife Commission Act of 30 June 1978 based on its historic values. The reserve is significant because of its connection to early policing in Central Australia, European settlement and early frontier contact between Aboriginal and European people.

The first police camp in Alice Springs was established in 1879 at the Alice Springs Telegraph Station. In 1879, Mounted Constable William Wilshire moved the camp via wagon to Heavitree Gap.

In 1904, the buildings were proclaimed to be a public gaol under the Prison Act 1869.

The condition of the site had deteriorated by the early 1960s and in 1967 work was undertaken to reconstruct it.

It is currently occupied by a caretaker.

It was listed on the Northern Territory Heritage Register on 15 February 1994.

References

Buildings and structures in Alice Springs
Northern Territory Heritage Register
Police stations in Australia